Reece Robinson (born 13 June 1987) is a Lebanon international rugby league footballer who most recently played for the Sydney Roosters in the NRL. 

He previously played for the Brisbane Broncos, Canberra Raiders and Parramatta Eels in the National Rugby League and the Indigenous All Stars at representative level. He has previously played rugby union for the New South Wales Waratahs in Super Rugby

Early life
Born in Sydney, New South Wales, Robinson is of Indigenous Australian and Lebanese descent. Robinson played his junior football for the Alexandria Rovers as well playing in the South Sydney Rabbitohs SG Ball team before joining the Brisbane Broncos. Robinson was educated at Randwick Boys High School. He also played Rugby union as a schoolboy.

Rugby league club career

Brisbane Broncos (2008)
In Round 3 against the North Queensland Cowboys, Robinson scored his first NRL career try in the Broncos 36–2 win at Suncorp Stadium. Robinson finished his debut year in the NRL with him playing in 13 matches and scoring 4 tries. Robinson's contract with the Brisbane Broncos was not renewed for the 2009 season.

North Sydney Bears (2009) 
Robinson was picked up by the North Sydney Bears, the feeder club for the South Sydney Rabbitohs, in the New South Wales Cup in 2009. On 12 December, Robinson was signed by the Canberra Raiders after recommendation from Wayne Bennett starting from 2010.  Robinson made 22 appearances for Norths and scored 22 tries.

Canberra Raiders (2010–2014)
In Round 1 of the 2010 NRL season, Robinson made his club debut for the Canberra Raiders against the Penrith Panthers on the wing in the Raiders 34–16 loss at Penrith Stadium. In Round 25 against the North Queensland Cowboys, Robinson scored an impressive 4 tries in the 48–4 win at Canberra Stadium. Robinson played in 5 matches and scored 5 tries for his first season Raiders.

Robinson played in 14 matches and scored 5 tries for the Raiders in 2011.

Robinson finished 2012 as the Raiders top tryscorer with 17 tries in 24 matches.

Robinson played in 22 matches, scored 7 tries and kicked a goal for the Raiders in 2013.

In February, Robinson was selected in the Canberra Raiders inaugural 2014 Auckland Nines squad. Robinson played in 18 matches, scored 10 tries and kicked 2 goals for the Raiders in 2014. On 15 October 2014, Robinson signed a one-year deal with the Parramatta Eels to be a candidate to replace the departed Eels fullback Jarryd Hayne.

Parramatta Eels (2015)
In January, Robinson played for the Parramatta Eels in the 2015 NRL Auckland Nines. In Round 3 against the New Zealand Warriors, Robinson scored his first club try for the Eels in the 29–16 loss at Mt Smart Stadium.

Sydney Roosters
On 7 December 2017, it was revealed that Robinson had signed a one-year deal to join The Sydney Roosters. In round 5 of the 2018 NRL season, Robinson scored his first club try just 13 seconds left before full-time siren for the Roosters in a 28-10 win at Southern Cross Group Stadium. The Roosters went on to win the Minor Premiership and Grand Final in 2018.  On 31 October 2018, Robinson was announced as one of the players that was released by the club after not being offered a new contract.

Queanbeyan Kangaroos
In 2019, Robinson played for the Queanbeyan Kangaroos in the Canberra Raiders Cup competition.

Rugby league representative career

Robinson played for the Lebanon national rugby league team in the 2009 European Cup, scoring a hat-trick of tries in an 86–0 thrashing of Italy.

Robinson played in 3 matches, scored 5 tries and kicked 4 goals in the tournament. On 9 February 2013, Robinson starred on the wing for the Indigenous All Stars scoring a second half hat trick in the 32–6 win against the NRL All Stars at Suncorp Stadium.

Robinson has been chosen to represent Lebanon again in the 2017 Rugby League World Cup but withdrew due to injury.

Rugby union career
On 15 October 2015, Robinson switched codes to Rugby union, signing a 2-year contract with Super Rugby side New South Wales Waratahs. He played in the 2016 National Rugby Championship for New South Wales Country Eagles, winning the Minor Championship and runners up in the Grand Final.

Personal life
Robinson has a twin brother, Travis Robinson, who is contracted to the Melbourne Storm and a member of the Lebanon national rugby league team. Robinson is also a relative of Australian boxer Anthony Mundine, former professional rugby league footballer Nathan Merritt and is step brothers with ex-South Sydney player Beau Champion.

References

External links

Sydney Roosters profile
Waratahs profile
2015 Parramatta Eels profile

Reece Robinson at the Rugby League project
2017 RLWC profile

1987 births
Living people
Australian people of Lebanese descent
Australian rugby league players
Australian rugby union players
Brisbane Broncos players
Canberra Raiders players
Indigenous All Stars players
Indigenous Australian rugby league players
Lebanon national rugby league team players
Mount Pritchard Mounties players
New South Wales Waratahs players
Newcastle Yowies players
North Sydney Bears NSW Cup players
Parramatta Eels players
Rugby league fullbacks
Rugby league players from Sydney
Rugby league wingers
Rugby union players from Sydney
Rugby union wings
Souths Logan Magpies players
Sydney Roosters players